Myren is a surname. Notable people with the surname include:

People
 Klara Myrén (born 1991), Swedish ice hockey player
 Ronald L. Myren (1937–2003), Canadian artist
 Scott P. Myren (born 1964), American jurist
 Ursula Myrén (born 1966), Swedish judoka

See also
 Myren, community in Munising Township, Michigan
 Myren Formation, geological formation in Norway
 Myrens Verksted, industrial area of Norway